The 1992 Dubai Duty Free Classic was a professional ranking snooker tournament that took place in October 1992 at the Al Nasr Stadium in Dubai, United Arab Emirates.

Defending champion John Parrott won the tournament, defeating Stephen Hendry 9–8 in the final.


Main draw

References

Dubai Classic
Dubai Classic
Dubai Classic
Dubai Classic